Alton railway station is a former railway station in Staffordshire. Opened in 1849 by the North Staffordshire Railway and called Alton, the station was part of the Churnet Valley line and served the village of Alton and the country estate at Alton Towers. In 1954, the station was renamed Alton Towers. After being closed in 1965, the station site was purchased by Staffordshire County Council in 1969 to curtail persistent vandalism of the station building, and in 1979 was sold to the Landmark Trust, who renamed the site to Alton Station and converted the former station buildings into holiday accommodation.

History 

At the height of the so-called "Railway Mania", when railways were being built across the whole country, the North Staffordshire Railway obtained Parliament's permission to build a number of lines, one of which was the Churnet Valley Line, on 26 June 1845. A temporary station was erected in Alton which opened on 13 July 1849, and the permanent station buildings opened the following year. The station's design followed an Italianate villa style, unique in this respect among all NSR stations, which were a Tudor or Jacobean style. The architecture is variously attributed to A.W. Pugin and Henry Arthur Hunt, the latter of whom designed most of the NSR's stations.

Early passengers included many day visitors coming in large numbers from the Staffordshire Potteries to visit nearby Alton Towers, the country estate of the Earl of Shrewsbury. A luggage lift was installed to hoist the Earl's baggage up to Alton Towers. The station also comprised a three-storey tower which contained the Earl's suite of waiting rooms and its platform was made particularly long to satisfy the Earl's desire to have impressive surroundings in which to receive his guests.

Several additions were made during the 1880s:
 1882 - goods yard and sidings enlarged, signal box built
 1882 - waiting room extended with a new booking office
 1884 - platforms lengthened, pathway directly to the Towers built

The station experienced a great increase in use from 1924, when Alton Towers was sold to become a tourist attraction, with its gardens and parts of the house open for public use, although it did not become a theme park for several decades afterwards. It became part of the London, Midland and Scottish Railway during the Grouping of 1923. The station then passed on to the London Midland Region of British Railways on nationalisation in 1948, and thereafter the line began to decline. In January 1954, the station was renamed Alton Towers in recognition of its previous service to the Alton Towers estate. Passenger service was greatly reduced from 1960, with eventual closure by the British Railways Board occurring in 1965. Vandalism of the waiting room became a problem soon thereafter, and the station buildings, platform and sections of line were purchased by Staffordshire County Council in 1969.

Design and layout 

The former station buildings, attributed variously to Augustus Pugin and local architect Henry Arthur Hunt, are of an Italianate villa style unique to the former North Staffordshire Railway and was built at the request of Charles Chetwynd-Talbot, 19th Earl of Shrewsbury, who owned the Alton Towers estate and wished for an impressive station where he might impress his guests. When in use as a railway station, Alton Towers also possessed a three-storey tower, unusually long platforms, and a luggage lift to the Alton Towers estate, all of which were built at the Earl's request.

The site today

The station buildings, which are grade II listed, were acquired by the Landmark Trust and the stationmaster's house converted into holiday accommodation, opening in 1972. In 2008 the Landmark Trust converted the waiting-room to provide additional accommodation space.  The buildings are occasionally open to the public as part of an "Open Day" scheme run by the Trust.

See also
Listed buildings in Farley, Staffordshire

References

External links 

  Landmark Trust official site
  Alton station on navigable 1946 O. S. map
  Alton station on navigable 1955 OS map

Disused railway stations in Staffordshire
Beeching closures in England
Railway stations in Great Britain opened in 1849
Railway stations in Great Britain closed in 1965
Grade II listed railway stations
Italianate architecture in England
Grade II listed buildings in Staffordshire
Landmark Trust properties in England
Former North Staffordshire Railway stations
Repurposed railway stations in Europe
1849 establishments in England